Deva Mahal (pronounced 'diva') is a soul and R&B singer. Mahal is the daughter of US-American blues musician Taj Mahal.

Deva joined father Taj Mahal in Michael Dorf's tribute to Aretha Franklin at Carnegie Hall in New York City on  March 6, 2017. They performed "Chain of Fools". Other artists that performed included Todd Rundgren and Sarah Dash. One year later, Mahal returned to Carnegie Hall for Dorf's next tribute night, "The Music of Led Zeppelin". She was joined by Dap-Kings guitarist Binky Griptite on "Your Time Is Gonna Come".

Early life 
Deva Mahal was born in Hawaii to parents Taj Mahal and Inshirah Mahal. When she was 17, they moved to New Zealand before settling in New York City. She played with various artists around New York before pursuing a career as a solo artist.

Career

Pre-2017: Early work 
Mahal began writing and performing music as a child, gigging from age 5. She has worked with artists including TV on the Radio, Sharon Jones & The Dap Kings and Fat Freddy's Drop. Mahal provided backing vocals on Hollie Smith's Long Player and Fat Freddy's Drop's album Based on a True Story, track "Wandering Eye".  She also collaborated with keyboardist Steph Brown in the band "Fredericks Brown"  The duo toured and put out a pair of EPs together with guitarist Michael Taylor.

2017: Deva Mahal EP 
Mahal launched her solo career by initially releasing three songs as a self-titled extended play, Deva Mahal, in October 2017.

2018: Run Deep 
Mahal released her debut album 'Run Deep' March 23, 2018. The album was produced by Scott Jacoby. GRAMMY.com revealed she was their No. 1 'Best New Bands' from South by Southwest 2018.

2019: 'Goddamn' and 'Your Only One' 
Mahal released 2 singles, 'Goddamn' and 'Your Only One' following her debut album 'Run Deep'. The singles were co-produced by Mahal and Son Little.

Musical style 
Mahal's musical style ranges from Soul, Funk, R&B and Blues and she cites Tracy Chapman, Nina Simone and Lauryn Hill as some of her influences. Her soulful vocal style has been compared to Amy Winehouse.

Personal life 
In 2020, Mahal was featured on the second season of Netflix's dating reality show Dating Around where she identified as being attracted to both men and women. In the third episode, titled 'Deva', she states she's been living in New Orleans since December 2019.

Discography

Albums

Extended plays

Run Deep track listing 
 "Can't Call It Love"
 "Snakes"
 "Fire"
 "Dream"
 "Shards"
 "Run Deep" (featuring Coco Peila)
 "Turnt Up" (featuring Allen Stone)
 "Superman" (Interlude)
 "Optimist"
 "Wicked"
 "It's Down to You"
 "Take a Giant Step"

References

Singers from New York City
Living people
Motéma Music artists
Bisexual musicians
American LGBT singers
LGBT people from Hawaii
1982 births